The Queen's Head is a pub in Newton, Cambridgeshire, England. 

It is Grade II listed and has been a pub since 1729. It is on the Regional Inventory of Historic Pub Interiors for East Anglia. The pub sign depicts Anne of Cleves.

It has been listed in every edition of CAMRA's Good Beer Guide since 1974, one of only five pubs to achieve this. In 2021 it received a Golden Award from CAMRA, one of only 32 pubs.

References

Pubs in Cambridgeshire
Grade II listed pubs in Cambridgeshire